Cryptazeca vasconica is a species of gastropod in the family Cochlicopidae. It is endemic to Spain.

Sources
 Mollusc Specialist Group 1996.  Cryptazeca vasconica.   2006 IUCN Red List of Threatened Species.   Downloaded on 6 August 2007.

Fauna of Spain
Vasconica
Endemic fauna of Spain
Gastropods described in 1884
Taxonomy articles created by Polbot